Joseph W. Stack (November 5, 1912 – October 13, 1954) was an American professional basketball player. He played in the National Basketball League for Whiting/Hammond Ciesar All-Americans and averaged 4.6 points per game.

References 

1912 births
1954 deaths
American men's basketball players
Basketball players from Indiana
Forwards (basketball)
Guards (basketball)
Hammond Ciesar All-Americans players
Whiting Ciesar All-Americans players